A Return to the Inner Experience is the second album by the American band Sky Cries Mary, released in 1993 through Capitol Records. "Gone" was released as a single.

Critical reception

The Washington Post noted that "the sometimes-realized intention is to be trippy, although a few of the 14 meandering tracks on this 70-minute album are more soporific than transcendent."

Track listing

Personnel 
Sky Cries Mary
DJ Fallout – sampler, turntables, drum machine
Joseph E. Howard – double bass, mellotron, sitar
Ben Ireland – drums, percussion
Marc Olsen – guitar
Gordon Raphael – keyboards
Anisa Romero – vocals, art direction
Roderick Wolgamott Romero – vocals, art direction
Production and additional personnel
Beth Custer – bass clarinet on "Buss to Gate 23"
Joe Gastwirt – mastering
Norman Kerner – production, engineering, mixing
Tommy Steele – art direction
Stephen Walker – art direction, design

References

External links 
 

1993 albums
Capitol Records albums
Sky Cries Mary albums